Songdo station is a railway station in Songdo-ri, Anju, South P'yŏngan, North Korea. It is on located on the  Kubongsan Line and the Namhŭng Line of the Korean State Railway.

References

Railway stations in North Korea